The 1945 U.S. National Championships (now known as the US Open) was a tennis tournament that took place on the outdoor grass courts at the West Side Tennis Club, Forest Hills in New York City, United States. The tournament ran from 28 August until 3 September. It was the 65th staging of the U.S. National Championships, and due to World War II it was the only Grand Slam tennis event of the year.

Finals

Men's singles

 Frank Parker defeated  William Talbert  14–12, 6–1, 6—2

Women's singles

 Sarah Palfrey Cooke defeated  Pauline Betz  3–6, 8–6, 6–4

Men's doubles
 Gardnar Mulloy /  Bill Talbert defeated  Bob Falkenburg /  Jack Tuero 12–10, 8–10, 12–10, 6–2

Women's doubles
 Louise Brough /  Margaret Osborne defeated  Pauline Betz /  Doris Hart 6–3, 6–3

Mixed doubles
 Margaret Osborne /   Bill Talbert defeated  Doris Hart /  Bob Falkenberg 6–4, 6–4

References

External links
Official US Open website

 
U.S. National Championships (tennis) by year
U.S. National Championships
U.S. National Championships
U.S. National Championships
U.S. National Championships